Stephen Kebwe (born 13 July 1957) is a Tanzanian CCM politician and Member of Parliament for Serengeti constituency since 2010.
2015-2019 Regional Commissioner for Morogoro

References

1957 births
Living people
Tanzanian medical doctors
Chama Cha Mapinduzi MPs
Deputy government ministers of Tanzania
Tanzanian MPs 2010–2015
Kazima Secondary School alumni
Old Moshi Secondary School alumni
Muhimbili University of Health and Allied Sciences alumni